Isethionates are esters of long-chain aliphatic carboxylic acids (C8 – C18) with isethionic acid (2-hydroxyethanesulfonic acid) or salts thereof, such as ammonium isethionate or sodium isethionate. They are also referred to as acyl isethionates or acyloxyethanesulfonates.

Like the taurides, isethionates are a class of particularly mild anionic surfactants which, unlike ordinary soaps, retain their washing-active properties even in hard water. Isethionates are obtained on an industrial scale reacting mixtures of carboxylic acids with salts of isethionic acid under acidic catalysis e. g. with methanesulfonic acid. The mixtures of carboxylic acids are obtained from the hydrolysis of animal fats (tallow) or vegetable oils, preferably coconut oil, but also palm oil, soybean oil or castor oil.

Isethionates are solids which are often mixed with fatty acids (up to 30% by weight) to lower their freezing point. Despite its low water solubility (100ppm at 25 °C), the lower-priced sodium cocoylisethionate has found more widespread use than its well water-soluble ammonium salt (> 25 wt.% at 25 °C). To solubilize the sparsely soluble isethionates and taurides, the formation of mixtures with amphoteric surfactants (such as cocamidopropyl betaine) are proposed. From such mixtures, it is possible to prepare liquid, clear and transparent aqueous concentrates which are liquid at room temperature.

Isethionates are characterized by excellent skin compatibility, excellent foaming (even in hard water), good cleansing properties and a pleasant skin feel. They are non-toxic and readily biodegradable.  However, in contrast to the taurides, they are not long-term stable outside a pH range of 5 to 8. Isethionates are used in solid soaps (so-called syndet bars) and in other personal care products such as lotions, washing and shower gels, shampoos, liquid soaps, shaving creams, and other cosmetic and dermatological preparations.

List

References

Literature 
Wilfried Umbach (Hrsg.), Kosmetik und Hygiene von Kopf bis Fuß, Wiley-VCH Verlag GmbH & Co. KGaA, 3. vollst. überarb. u. erw. Auflage (27. Juli 2012), 

Sulfonic acids
Carboxylate esters
Surfactants